Belton-in-Rutland is a village and civil parish in the county of Rutland in the East Midlands of England. The population at the 2001 census was 345 increasing to 348 at the 2011 census.   It is situated about six miles (9.6 km) southwest of Oakham and about four miles (6.4 km) west of Uppingham and overlooks the A47. The Eye Brook forms the county boundary with Leicestershire.

The village's name probably means 'farm/settlement near a beacon or funeral pyre'. Then again, 'Bel' may likewise address a component signifying 'island' or 'glade'. Belton was renamed Belton-in-Rutland in 1982 to distinguish the village from Belton in Leicestershire.

St Peter's Church is a Grade II* listed building.

The village has one public house, The Sun Inn.

Belton is part of Braunston & Belton ward which has one councillor on Rutland County Council.

References

External links

Rutland Website – Belton-in-Rutland
Belton In Rutland History

Villages in Rutland
Civil parishes in Rutland